Ricinocarpos is a plant genus of the family Euphorbiaceae first described as a genus in 1817. The entire genus is endemic to Australia.

Species

formerly included
moved to Acalypha Baloghia  Bertya

References 

 FloraBase - the Western Australian Flora: Ricinocarpos
  PlantNET: Flora of New South Wales Online: Ricinocarpos
 

Euphorbiaceae genera
Crotonoideae
Endemic flora of Australia
Taxa named by René Louiche Desfontaines